The 41st Annual Annie Awards honoring excellence in the field of animation of 2013 were held on February 1, 2014 at the University of California, Los Angeles's Royce Hall in Los Angeles, California, presenting in 35 categories. On December 2, 2013, the nominations for Annie Awards were announced.

Production nominees

Individual achievement categories

Awards

References

External links

 
 Annie Awards 2014 at Internet Movie Database

2013
2013 film awards
Annie
Annie